Marijo Dodik (born 18 February 1974 in Sarajevo) is a Bosnian retired football striker.

Club career
Dodik started his career at Željezničar Sarajevo before leaving war-torn Bosnia and being picked up by the Belgian side Mechelen in 1995, where he spent two seasons in the Jupiler League and scored 20 goals in a total of 84 appearances. He spent the next season in Turkey's Sakaryaspor, before moving to Croatia and joining Slaven Belupo in 1998.

He spent his most successful years at Slaven, establishing himself as a first-team regular and the club's most prolific Prva HNL scorer with 75 goals in 228 appearances in a total of eight seasons between 1998 and 2007. During his time at Slaven he also netted 14 goals in 22 appearances in club's European campaigns in the Intertoto Cup, and holds the record for most goals scored by a player in a single Prva HNL game, scoring an incredible 6 goals against Varteks on 21 October 2000 in a 7–1 win.

In 2007, Slaven refused to renew his contract so he moved to Cibalia where he netted 5 goals in 28 appearances, and in 2008 he went on to Inter Zaprešić, where he played until 2009 and his retirement from professional football. Dodik continued, however, playing for lower-tier amateur Croatian and Slovenian teams, such as NK Zelina, NK Sabarija Subotica Podravska, NK Rudar Trbovlje and NK Mladost Mali Otok.

International career
He made his debut for Bosnia and Herzegovina in a May 1998 friendly match away against Argentina and has earned a total of 4 caps, scoring 1 goal. He scored that goal in a 2002 World Cup qualifier against Liechtenstein in 2001. His final international was a March 2002 friendly against Macedonia.

International goals
''Scores and results table. Bosnia and Herzegovina's goal tally first:

References

External links
 Profile at Sportnet.hr

1974 births
Living people
Footballers from Sarajevo
Association football forwards
Bosnia and Herzegovina footballers
Bosnia and Herzegovina international footballers
FK Željezničar Sarajevo players
K.V. Mechelen players
Sakaryaspor footballers
NK Slaven Belupo players
HNK Cibalia players
NK Inter Zaprešić players
NK Zelina players
Premier League of Bosnia and Herzegovina players
Belgian Pro League players
Challenger Pro League players
Süper Lig players
Croatian Football League players
Bosnia and Herzegovina expatriate footballers
Expatriate footballers in Belgium
Bosnia and Herzegovina expatriate sportspeople in Belgium
Expatriate footballers in Turkey
Bosnia and Herzegovina expatriate sportspeople in Turkey
Expatriate footballers in Croatia
Bosnia and Herzegovina expatriate sportspeople in Croatia
Expatriate footballers in Slovenia
Bosnia and Herzegovina expatriate sportspeople in Slovenia